The 1901 Add-Ran Christian football team was an American football team that represented Add-Ran Christian University (renamed Texas Christian University (TCU) the following year) as an independent during the 1901 college football season. The team played its home games in Waco, Texas, and compiled a 1–2–1 record.

Schedule

References

Add-Ran Christian
TCU Horned Frogs football seasons
Add-Ran Christian football